F-box/WD repeat-containing protein 4 is a protein that in humans is encoded by the FBXW4 gene.

This gene is a member of the F-box/WD-40 gene family, which recruit specific target proteins through their WD-40 protein-protein binding domains for ubiquitin mediated degradation. In mouse, a highly similar protein is thought to be responsible for maintaining the apical ectodermal ridge of developing limb buds; disruption of the mouse gene results in the absence of central digits, underdeveloped or absent metacarpal/metatarsal bones and syndactyly. This phenotype is remarkably similar to split hand-split foot malformation in humans, a clinically heterogeneous condition with a variety of modes of transmission. An autosomal recessive form has been mapped to the chromosomal region where this gene is located, and complex rearrangements involving duplications of this gene and others have been associated with the condition. A pseudogene of this locus has been mapped to one of the introns of the BCR gene on chromosome 22.

References

Further reading